The R364 is a Regional Route in South Africa that connects Lamberts Bay to the R27 between Calvinia and Nieuwoudtville via Clanwilliam.

Route
The route's western terminus is the R365 at Lambert's Bay. It heads east for 31 kilometres, reaching Graafwater. From Graafwater, it continues east for 28 kilometres to reach an interchange with the N7 near Clanwilliam. After another three kilometres heading east, it reaches Clanwilliam. From Clanwilliam, it enters the Cederberg range where it runs through the Pakhuis Pass. From there, it winds north-north-east through another two passes, Botterkloof Pass and Bloukrans Pass, to reach its terminus at the R27 near Calvinia. The total distance from Clanwilliam to the R27 is 116 kilometres.

External links
 Routes Travel Info
 Pakhuis Pass

References

Regional Routes in the Western Cape
Regional Routes in the Northern Cape